Arxellia tenorioi is a species of sea snail, a marine gastropod mollusk, in the family Solariellidae.

Description
The size of the shell varies between 4.7 mm and 5.7 mm.

Distribution
This marine species occurs off the Philippines.

References

 Poppe G.T., Tagaro S.P. & Dekker H. (2006) The Seguenziidae, Chilodontidae, Trochidae, Calliostomatidae and Solariellidae of the Philippine Islands. Visaya Supplement 2: 1-228. page(s): 128

External links
 
  Vilvens, C.; Williams, S. T.; Herbert, D. G. (2014). New genus Arxellia with new species of Solariellidae (Gastropoda: Trochoidea) from New Caledonia, Papua New Guinea, Philippines, Western Australia, Vanuatu and Tonga. Zootaxa. 3826(1): 255

Solariellidae